Brestov may refer to:

 Brestov in Humenné District, Slovakia
 Brestov in Prešov District, Slovakia
 Brestov nad Laborcom  in Medzilaborce District, Slovakia